Siatista is a town and a former municipality in Kozani regional unit, Western Macedonia, Greece. Since the 2011 local government reform it is part of the municipality Voio, of which it is the seat and a municipal unit. The municipal unit has an area of 158.524 km2, the community 94.426 km2. The 2011 Greek census recorded 5,490 residents in the town and 6,247 in the municipal unit.

Administrative division

The municipal unit of Siatista consists of the following municipal communities (populations as of 2011):
Siatista, population 5,490
Mikrokastro, population 446
Palaiokastro, population 311
The municipal community of Palaiokastro comprises two settlements: Palaiokastro and Dafnero.

History

The first name of the city was Kalyvia. This name is referenced in the archives of the Zavordas Monastery.

In 1745, the city is referenced in a formal document of Joseph, Archbishop of Ohrid. The commercial ties between Siatista and Central Europe during 17th and 18th centuries were very successful, and allowed the inhabitants to build many mansions and churches with wonderful frescos and icons.

Siatista lies in a unique setting where its mountains and wilderness provide a strong sense of solitude. As a result, many Siatistan had to become merchants as to import (or export) necessary goods. Many of them found their way abroad permanently or temporarily where they distinguished themselves as able and reliable merchants. Many of them who became wealthy never return in their town staying for ever in the big cities all over the Balkan Peninsula. Those who choose to return built large and elegant mansions distinguished by their thick walls, imposing doors, lavishly decorated "ondas", gorgeous stained glasses, and lively colours in the folk paintings on their walls. All of this embodies their high standard of living, a rather rare phenomenon for such an isolated town. Many of those mansions are still in good shape today in the old city.

One of such a self-made wealthy merchants was Theodoros Dimitriou who together with his wife Afrati left their town at 1790 for Zagreb, then an Austrian city. He managed to earn a significant fortune by trading a variety of goods which helped them to give a proper education to their children. Of them, Dimitrios destined to become a famous and celebrated personality for his role as a leading figure in the movement for the national awakening of the Croatian people (then under Austro-Hungarian rule) as a national writer, poet, dramatist and political activist. Recognized as one of the most learned people of his time, he was the first who imposed the Croatian language in the local literacy, he created the National Croatian Theater in Zagreb and became famous for his political activism for the Croatian national revival through his key role in many Croatian patriotic pamphlets at the time. Demeter's award for drama which established 35 years after his death (1872) stood until nowadays and his bust decorates the yard of the Croatian National Theater in Zagreb.

In 1888 Ioannis Trampatzes, another expatriate Greek merchant in Romania, donated the funds for the Trampatzeion Gymnasium. The gymnasium housed two large libraries, the Manouseios with 5,000 books and the Roussopouleios with 2,000.

Siatista was liberated from the Ottoman Turks by the Greek army, on 4 November 1912 during the First Balkan War. In March 1943, the Battle of Fardykambos was fought near the town between the Royal Italian Army and the partisans of EAM-ELAS, with the participation of many of the local inhabitants.

Celebrations

15 August  – Assumption of Mary – The male inhabitants of Siatista parade with their horses down to a chapel in the plain and return with the icon of the Panagia. In the feast and party that ensues the men dance on the backs of their horses. The local wine flows freely, even for their equine friends.
23 December – Κλαδαριές (Klatharies) – On this day the inhabitants build tall, (three to six metres), conical shaped mounds that are decorated sparsely with balloons and tinsel. Each neighbourhood group gathers weeds and sticks of wood from the surrounding area throughout the preceding fall, with some groups historically sabotaging one another days before the event.  After nightfall, a parade, including a brass band playing local music, starts at the entrance of the town, and marches up from Γεράνια (Yerania), to the top of the town. In succession each mound of brush is set afire as the parade reaches the neighbourhood.  The inhabitants then dance around the fires. Many of the village youth then stay up all night around the remnants of the bonfires to start carolling early in the morning of Christmas Eve, collecting money while singing door to door.

Notable people
Alexandros Rosios, politician
Michail Papageorgiou, philosopher
Peristera Kraka, commander of rebel forces during the 1878 Greek Macedonian rebellion
Poulios Markides-Pouliou and Georgios Markides-Pouliou, publishers of Efimeris in Vienna and partners of Rigas Feraios
Thalia Flora-Karavia, painter
Theodoros Manousis, historian
Theodoros Natsinas, teacher

See also
Ecclesiastical Museum of Siatista
Paleontological Museum of Siatista
Botanical Museum of the Mountaineering Association (Siatista)

References

External links
Siatista
Siatista News

 
Former municipalities in Western Macedonia
Populated places in Kozani (regional unit)